Bloomsday may refer to:
Bloomsday, a commemoration on 16 June in honor of James Joyce.
Lilac Bloomsday Run, a road running event in Spokane, Washington.
Bloomsday, episode nineteen, season two of the cartoon The Tick.